The Little Island is a book by Margaret Wise Brown under the pseudonym Golden MacDonald and illustrated by Leonard Weisgard.  Released by Doubleday in 1946, it was the recipient of the Caldecott Medal for illustration in 1947. It describes the four seasons as experienced by a little island. The book is lyrically written, an example being: "Winter came/ and the snow fell softly/ like a great quiet secret in the night/ cold and still."

Plot
A little island in the ocean changes as the seasons comes and go -- spring and summer bring flowers, seals, and birds, and days and nights. One day a kitten visits the island with a family on a picnic. This kitten opines that the island is small and isolated; however, the island retorts that it, like the kitten, is also a part of the world. When the kitten disputes the island's claim, the island suggests that it ask any fish. The kitten catches a fish and demands, on pain of being eaten, to know how the island is part of the bigger land. The fish invites the kitten down into the water to see, which the kitten of course cannot do. The kitten demands to be shown another way. 'Then you will have to take it on faith', says the fish -- 'to believe what I tell you about what you don't know." The fish then tells him "how all lands are one land under the sea." The cat realizes he has learned a great secret, which he loves, and lets the fish go before leaving the island. The island settles back into the timeless cycle of the seasons -- autumn, winter, storms, and calm.

Critical response
Golden MacDonald was a pen name for Margaret Wise Brown of Goodnight Moon fame. The text of the book captures Brown's appreciation for the subtle rhythms of nature, and the connections that all beings and objects in nature have with one another. 

The book won a Caldecott Medal for its shimmering and tingling watercolors. The images create a mood of the perpetual essence of nature, and our connections to one another through the blue-green and grey color palette. The Little Island is one of the great masterpieces in achieving that remarkable accomplishment. 

The book covers the four seasons as they affect the little island and the plants and animals that visit the island. To show the ongoing nature of the process, the book's timeline expands beyond a single year. The island is described as being: "A part of the world and a world of its own all surrounded by the bright blue sea."

The Little Island is all about faith. Having the kitten go fishing is an allusion to the proverb of teaching a man to fish, rather than providing him with fish, and the kitten that comes from ashore learns a secret about the island and a lesson about faith. The connection to John Donne is made in the context of the kitten visitor to the island. "Maybe I am an island too . . . a little fur Island in the air". The connections run in all directions.  The kitten gets the answer there, but cannot get firm proof. He just has to take the fish's word for it. This is an obvious allusion to the element of faith in people understanding of the spiritual nature of our connections to one another. Many animals need the little island to go through their annual cycle, such as the seals who raise their young on the island. Many of the insects and birds come from the mainland across the sea. The weather affects the sea, the island, and the mainland alike as do the tides. The story is strengthened by what children choose to read the book and have opportunities to share scientific facts, spiritual connections, and to explain the mutual dependency that occurs in nature.

References

American picture books
Caldecott Medal–winning works
1946 children's books
Works published under a pseudonym
Books by Margaret Wise Brown
Doubleday (publisher) books